React is the first official live album, and fifth overall, by British new wave band the Fixx, released in 1987. It was recorded during three concerts in Canada in 1986 in the band's tour in support of their album Walkabout. The album contains three new studio tracks: "Big Wall", "Rules and Schemes", and "Don't Be Scared", which was released as a single.  Also included is a re-recorded studio version of "Red Skies".

Track listing
All songs are written by Dan K. Brown, Cy Curnin, Rupert Greenall, Jamie West-Oram, and Adam Woods, except where noted.

Studio tracks 1-4 recorded and mixed at The Townhouse Studios, London.

Tracks 5,6,8 & 11 recorded at Le Spectrum, Montreal, Quebec  22 October 1986

Tracks 7,9,10,12 & 13 recorded at Massey Hall, Toronto, Ontario  24 October 1986

"Red Skies" (Carlton "Carlie" Barrett, Curnin, Greenall, West-Oram, Woods) – 4:33
"Big Wall" – 4:15
"Don't Be Scared" – 5:00
"Rules and Schemes" – 3:43
"Deeper and Deeper" – 4:20
"Stand or Fall" (Barrett, Curnin, Greenall, West-Oram, Woods) – 4:25
"Built for the Future" – 4:04
"Saved by Zero" (Alfie Agius, Curnin, Greenall, West-Oram, Woods) – 3:26
"Are We Ourselves?" – 2:44
"One Thing Leads to Another" (Agius, Curnin, Greenall, West-Oram, Woods) – 4:11
CD extra tracks:
"Less Cities, More Moving People" – 4:12
"Chase the Fire" – 5:29
CD/Cassette extra track:
"Secret Separation" (Brown, Curnin, Greenall, Jeannette Obstoj, West-Oram, Woods) – 4:56

Personnel
Cy Curnin - lead vocals
Rupert Greenall - keyboards, backing vocals
Jamie West-Oram - guitar, backing vocals
Dan K. Brown - bass, backing vocals
Adam Woods - drums

Additional personnel
Steve Gregory - saxophone
Jeff Scantlebury - percussion, saxophone

Production
Producer: Hugh Padgham
Engineers: Guillame Bengle, Scott Litt, Doug McClement, Hugh Padgham
Mixing: Hugh Padgham
Mastering: Bob Ludwig
Art direction: Michael Ross
Design: Michael Ross
Photography: Peter Mountain

Charts
Album - Billboard (United States)

Singles - Billboard (United States)

The Fixx albums
Albums produced by Hugh Padgham
1987 live albums
MCA Records live albums